DenGee Livin' is the third studio album by American rap group DenGee (formerly known as 187 Fac). It was released May 23, 2000 on Ronlan Entertainment. The album was produced entirely by E-A-Ski & CMT. It peaked at number 81 on the Billboard Top R&B/Hip-Hop Albums. The album features guest performances by Spice 1, E-A-Ski, Silk-E, San Quinn, Mr. Town and T-Pup.

Along with a single, a music video was released for the song, "VIP Status", and features a cameo appearance by producer E-A-Ski.

Black Rocket Records reissued DenGee Livin''' in 2001 with bonus tracks.

 Critical reception 
{{Album ratings
|rev1 = Rap Pages|rev1score = (positive)<ref name="Rap Pages">Columnist. [http://www.tower.com/dengee-livin-cd/wapi/106707013 Review: DenGee Livin']. Rap Pages: 50. July, 2000</ref>
}}Rap Pages'' (7/00, p. 50) - "...Pure adrenaline rushes that increase the heart rate, make the hair on your neck stand up and send chills down your spine....a sonic triumph..."

Track listing 
"Intro" - 0:27
"Break Bread" (featuring E-A-Ski) - 3:24
"Den & Gee" - 4:09
"Over Some Dope" - 3:47
"Space Age Pimpin'" (skit) - 0:49
"Lucy Turf Walker" (featuring Mr. Town) - 4:23
"Da Hustle" (featuring Silk-E) - 4:09
"Broken Glass" (featuring San Quinn & T-Pup) - 3:42
"Ni** At The Movies" (skit) - 0:53
"Wig Split" (featuring Spice 1) - 3:53
"VIP Status" - 4:35
"Can't Wait" (featuring Silk-E, No The Piper & T-Pup) - 4:15
"Characters" - 3:44
"What Do You Want" - 4:11
"Palms, Elbows & Back Arms" - 4:04

2001 CD reissue bonus tracks 
The album was re-released September 25, 2001 with the following bonus tracks:

"VIP Status - (1 remix)" - 4:35
"VIP Status - (2 remix)" - 4:35

Chart history

References

External links 
[ DenGee Livin'] at Allmusic
''DenGee Livin''' (reissue) at Tower Records

2000 albums
Albums produced by E-A-Ski
Gangsta rap albums by American artists
West Coast hip hop albums
187 Fac albums